is a railway station in the city of Nagano, Nagano Prefecture, Japan.

Lines
Amori Station is served by the Shin'etsu Main Line and is 6.4 kilometers from the terminus of the line at Shinonoi Station.

Station layout
The station consists of two opposed elevated side platforms serving two tracks, with the station building underneath. The tracks are connected by a footbridge.

Platforms

History
Amori Station opened on 14 March 1985. With the privatization of Japanese National Railways (JNR) on 1 April 1987, the station came under the control of JR East.

Passenger statistics
In fiscal 2015, the station was used by an average of 1,059 passengers daily (boarding passengers only).

Surrounding area

See also
List of railway stations in Japan

References

External links

 Amori Station (JR East)

Stations of East Japan Railway Company
Railway stations in Japan opened in 1985
Railway stations in Nagano (city)
Shin'etsu Main Line
Shinonoi Line
Shinano Railway Line